Lorcaserin, marketed under the brand name Belviq was a weight-loss drug developed by Arena Pharmaceuticals. It reduces appetite by activating a type of serotonin receptor known as the 5-HT2C receptor in a region of the brain called the hypothalamus, which is known to control appetite. It was approved in 2012, and in 2020, it was removed from the market in the United States due to an increased risk of cancer detected in users of Belviq.

Medical uses 

Lorcaserin was used long term for weight loss in those who are obese.

Side effects 

In December 2012, the US Drug Enforcement Administration proposed classifying lorcaserin as a Schedule IV drug because it has hallucinogenic properties at higher than approved doses and users could develop psychiatric dependencies on the drug. On 7 May 2013, the US Drug Enforcement Administration classified lorcaserin as a Schedule IV drug under the Controlled Substances Act.

There had been concern that lorcaserin could cause cardiac valvulopathy based upon the reports of subjects taking the drug in Phase 2 trials. However, a 2016 Phase 3 clinical trial found no statistically significant differences in valvulopathy rates compared to control, being 2.4% for the drug subjects and 2.0% for controls, and concluded that the drug was safe for the target population although more long-term data was needed.

In January 2020, a drug safety communication from the US Food and Drug Administration (FDA) stated that a clinical trial demonstrated a possible increased risk of cancer for those taking lorcaserin. The FDA approval of lorcaserin required the manufacturer to conduct a randomized, double-blind, placebo-controlled clinical trial to evaluate the risk of heart-related problems. The trial was conducted in approximately 12,000 participants over five years and more patients taking lorcaserin were diagnosed with cancer compared to patients taking placebo.

In February 2020, the FDA requested that the manufacturer of lorcaserin voluntarily withdraw the drug from the US market because a safety clinical trial showed an increased occurrence of cancer. The drug manufacturer, Eisai, voluntarily withdrew the drug.

Mechanism of action 

Lorcaserin is a selective 5-HT2C receptor agonist, and in vitro testing of the drug showed reasonable selectivity for 5-HT2C over other related targets. 5-HT2C receptors are located almost exclusively in the brain, and can be found in the choroid plexus, cortex, hippocampus, cerebellum, amygdala, thalamus, and hypothalamus. The activation of 5-HT2C receptors in the hypothalamus is supposed to activate proopiomelanocortin (POMC) production and consequently promote weight loss through satiety. This hypothesis is supported by clinical trials and other studies.  While it is generally thought that 5-HT2C receptors help to regulate appetite as well as mood, and endocrine secretion, the exact mechanism of appetite regulation was not known s of 2005. Lorcaserin has shown 100x selectivity for 5-HT2C versus the closely related 5-HT2B receptor, and 17x selectivity over the 5-HT2A receptor.

Approval history 

On 22 December 2009, a New Drug Application (NDA) was submitted to the Food and Drug Administration (FDA) in the United States.  

On 16 September 2010, an FDA advisory panel voted 9–5 against approval of the drug based on concerns over both efficacy and safety, particularly the findings of mammary gland tumors of female rats.  On 23 October 2010, the FDA decided not to approve the drug based on the available data. This was not only because cancer promoting properties could not be ruled out, but also because the weight loss efficacy was considered "marginal."

On 10 May 2012, after a new round of studies submitted by Arena, an FDA panel voted to recommend lorcaserin with certain restrictions and patient monitoring. The restrictions include patients with a BMI of over 30, or with a BMI over 27 and a comorbidity such as high blood pressure or type 2 diabetes. 

On 27 June 2012, the FDA approved lorcaserin for use in adults with a body mass index (BMI) of 30 or greater (obese), or adults with a BMI of 27 or greater (overweight) and who had at least one weight-related condition such as high blood pressure (hypertension), type 2 diabetes, or high cholesterol (dyslipidemia).

The safety and efficacy of Belviq were evaluated in three randomized, placebo-controlled trials that included nearly 8,000 obese and overweight patients, with and without type 2 diabetes, treated for 52 to 104 weeks. All participants received lifestyle modification that consisted of a reduced calorie diet and exercise counseling. Compared with placebo, treatment with Belviq for up to one year was associated with average weight loss ranging from 3 percent to 3.7 percent.

About 47 percent of patients without type 2 diabetes lost at least 5 percent of their body weight compared with about 23 percent of patients treated with placebo. In people with type 2 diabetes, about 38 percent of patients treated with Belviq and 16 percent treated with placebo lost at least 5 percent of their body weight. Belviq treatment was associated with favorable changes in glycemic control in those with type 2 diabetes. The approved labeling for Belviq recommends that the drug be discontinued in patients who fail to lose 5 percent of their body weight after 12 weeks of treatment, as these patients are unlikely to achieve clinically meaningful weight loss with continued treatment.

The drug's manufacturer was required to conduct six postmarketing studies, including a long-term cardiovascular outcomes trial to assess the effect of Belviq on the risk for major adverse cardiac events such as heart attack and stroke.

On July 15, 2016, the extended release version of lorcaserin was approved for use in the United States.

References

External links 
 

5-HT2A agonists
5-HT2B agonists
5-HT2C agonists
Anorectics
Antiobesity drugs
Benzazepines
Chloroarenes
CYP2D6 inhibitors
Psychedelic drugs